Christa Deguchi (出口 クリスタ  Deguchi Christa, born 29 October 1995) is a Canadian judoka.

Switch to representing Canada
In 2017, Deguchi switched to representing Canada from where she was born, Japan. Deguchi's dad is from Canada and this allowed her to compete for the country. In 2012, Deguchi was approached to represent Canada, before she competed for Japan but she refused. Realizing her best bet to make the Olympics would be competing for Canada, Deguchi eventually agreed to represent Canada.

Career
Deguchi participated at the 2018 World Judo Championships, winning a bronze medal. This made her the first female judoka representing Canada to win a World Judo Championships medal.
She won her first gold medal in the 2019 world championship

In 2021, she won the gold medal in her event at the 2021 Judo Grand Slam Antalya held in Antalya, Turkey. 
In August 2022, competing in her first major multi-sport event, the 2022 Commonwealth Games, Deguchi won the gold medal, defeating Acelya Toprak of England in the gold medal match of the 57 kg event.

In 2022, she won gold at the 2022 Judo Grand Slam Baku.

International Results

Representing Canada 
As of  27 August 2019

Representing Japan

See also
 Judo in Canada
 List of Canadian judoka

References

External links

 
 

1995 births
Living people
Canadian female judoka
Canadian sportspeople of Japanese descent
People from Nagano (city)
World judo champions
21st-century Canadian women
Judoka at the 2022 Commonwealth Games
Commonwealth Games gold medallists for Canada
Medallists at the 2022 Commonwealth Games